A fixed allele is an allele that is the only variant which exists for that gene in a population. A fixed allele is homozygous for all members of the population. The term allele normally refers to one variant gene out of several possible for a particular locus in the DNA. When all but one allele go extinct and only one remains, that allele is said to be fixed.

There are only two ways in which a fixed allele can become un-fixed: through random mutations that lead to the development of a new allele or through immigration.

Fixed alleles were first defined by Motoo Kimura in 1962. Kimura discussed how fixed alleles could arise within populations, and was the first to generalize the topic. He credits the works of Haldane in 1927 and Fisher in 1922 as being important in providing foundational information that allowed him to come to his conclusion. Kimura is responsible for the development of the neutral theory of molecular evolution, which discusses how most of the variation and evolution within species is caused by the random fluctuation of neutral allele frequencies, so by genetic drift, rather than natural selection. More recent studies have confirmed the works of these early evolutionary biologists, showing that rates of extinction decrease with increasing beneficial alleles, that extinction of deleterious alleles occurs faster than that of beneficial alleles, and that the process of adaptation can become very complex.

To illustrate what a fixed allele is, imagine a population of rabbits where there are three alleles for fur color brown, gray or white. In this initial population, there is no fixed allele. Then an event, such as a forest fire, causes the elimination of one of the alleles from the population. Assume all the gray rabbits were killed in a forest fire, and now all that remains in the population are the white and brown alleles. This happens in the summer, so there is no snow, and the white rabbits fall prey to owls more often than brown rabbits. Eventually the only remaining allele in the population is the brown allele; this allele is now a fixed allele.

Fixed alleles are a very important aspect of evolutionary biology. Low genetic diversity, which is seen with allele fixation, is dangerous as it can lead to mass extinctions. If there is little genetic variability within a population and the genetically similar individuals all are susceptible to a certain pathogen, the population will likely cease to exist. This is why there are examples of populations with fixed alleles becoming threatened or endangered.

An example of why fixed alleles matter is the threat of bioterrorism on US agriculture. Many crops grown in the US are genetically similar, and allows for the possibility of devastating bioterrorism. A pathogen could be developed that targets certain crop supplies such as corn, which are pivotal to the US's food supply and therefore vital to its economic state. Disastrous events could occur as the food supply would be depleted very quickly.

Process of allele fixation 
Fixation is the process through which an allele becomes a fixed allele within a population. There are many ways for an allele to become fixed, but most often it is through the action of multiple processes working together. The two key driving forces behind fixation are natural selection and genetic drift. Natural selection was postulated by Darwin and encompasses many processes that lead to the differential survival of organisms due to genetic or phenotypic differences. Genetic drift is the process by which allele frequencies fluctuate within populations. Natural selection and genetic drift propel evolution forward, and through evolution alleles can become fixed.  
 
The natural selection processes such as sexual, convergent, divergent or stabilizing selection pave the way for allele fixation. One way some of these natural selection processes cause fixation is through one specific genotype or phenotype being favored, which leads to the convergence of the variability until one allele become fixed. Natural selection can work the other way, where two alleles become fixed through two specific genotypes or phenotypes being favored, leading to divergence within the population until the populations become so separate that they are now two species each with their own fixed allele.

Selective pressures can favor certain genotypes or phenotypes. A commonly known example of this is the process of antibiotic resistance within bacterial populations. As antibiotics are used to kill bacteria, a small number of them with favorable mutations can survive and repopulate in an environment that is now free of competition. The allele for antibiotic resistance then becomes a fixed allele within the surviving and future populations. This is an example of the bottleneck effect. A bottleneck occurs when a population is put under strong selective pressure, and only certain individuals survive. These surviving individuals have a decreased number of alleles present within their population than were present in the initial population, however these remaining alleles are the only ones left in future populations assuming no mutation or migration. This bottleneck effect can also be seen in natural disaster, as shown in the rabbit example above.   

Similar to the bottleneck effect, the founder's effect can also cause allele fixation. The founder effect occurs when a small founding population is moved a new area and propagates the future population. This can be seen in the Alces alces moose population in Newfoundland, Canada. Moose are not native to Newfoundland, and in 1878 and 1904 six total moose were introduced to the island. The six founding moose propagated the current population of an estimated 4000–6000 moose. This has had dramatic effects on the offspring of the founding moose and has led to a great decrease in genetic variability within the Newfoundland moose population as compared to the mainland population.  
 
Other random processes such as genetic drift can lead to fixation. Through these random processes, some random individuals or alleles are removed from the population. These random fluctuations within the allele frequencies can lead to the fixation or loss of certain alleles within a population. To the right is an image that shows thorough successive generations; the allele frequencies fluctuate randomly within a population. The smaller your population size, the faster fixation or loss of alleles will occur. However, all populations are driven to allele fixation and it is inevitable; it just takes varying amounts of time for this to occur due to population size.  
 
Some other causes of allele fixation are inbreeding, as this decreases the genetic variability of the population and therefore decreases the effective population size. This allows genetic drift to cause fixation faster than anticipated.   
 
Isolation can also cause fixation, as it prevents the influx of new variable alleles into the population. This can often be seen on island populations, where the populations have a limited set of alleles. The only variability that can be added to these populations is through mutations.

Examples 
One example of a fixed allele is the DGAT-1 exon 8 in Anatolian buffalo. A non-conservative mutation in the DGAT-1 allele, which produces a protein with a lysine at position 232 instead of an alanine. This mutation produces a protein different from the wild type protein. This mutation in cattle has an effect in milk production. Investigation into three water buffalo populations revealed four different haplotypes each having a single nucleotide polymorphism (SNP), however all of these SNPs were conservative mutations, causing no change in protein production. All populations of Anatolian buffalo studied had the non-conservative lysine mutation at 232, leading to the conclusion that this DGAT-1 allele mutation is fixed within the populations.

The Parnassius apollo butterfly is classified as a threatened species, having many disjointed populations in Western Palaearctic region. The population in the Mosel Valley of Germany has been genetically characterized, and has shown to have six long-term monomorphic microsatellites. Six microsatellites were examined looking at the current population in 2008 as well as museum samples from 1895 to 1989. One of the microsatellite alleles examined has fixed within the population prior to 1895. For the current population all six microsatellites as well as all sixteen alloenzymes analyzed were fixed.

Fixed alleles can often be deleterious to populations, especially when there is a small population size and low genetic variability. For example, the California Channel Island Fox (Urocyon littoralis) has the most monomorphic population ever reported for a sexually reproducing animal. During the 1990s the Island Fox experienced disastrous population decline, leading to near extinction. This population decline was in part caused by the canine distemper virus, the foxes were susceptible to this virus, and due to their genetic similarity many were killed. The introduction of a predator, the golden eagle, also attributed to this population decline. With current conservation efforts the population is in recovery.

See also 
Meiotic drive

References

External links 
 Allele Fixation in Island Populations
 Population Size and Genetic Drift
 Population Genetics and Hardy Weinberg Equilibrium
 Genetic Drift Simulation
 Population Genetics Simulation

Population genetics